The 1955–56 Mexican Segunda División was the sixth season of the Mexican Segunda División. The season started on 10 July 1955 and concluded on 16 January 1956. It was won by Monterrey.

Changes 
 Atlas, Zamora and Cuautla were promoted to Primera División.
 C.D. Marte was relegated from Primera División.
 C.D. Anáhuac have dissolved.
 Oviedo returned after one season on hiatus, however, the team was relocated in Tlalnepantla de Baz.
 Montecarlo de Irapuato joined the league.

Teams 
{{location map+ |Mexico |float=center |width=700 |caption=1955-56 Season Teams|places=

League table

Results

References 

1955–56 in Mexican football
Segunda División de México seasons